The rivière du Moulin crosses the municipalities of Saint-Lazare, Saint-Nérée and Saint-Gervais, in the Bellechasse Regional County Municipality, in the administrative region of Chaudière-Appalaches, in Quebec, in Canada.

The Moulin river is a tributary of the south bank of the Bras Saint-Michel, which flows north-east to empty onto the north-west bank of the rivière du Sud (Montmagny); the latter flows north-east to the south shore of the St. Lawrence River.

Geography 

  east, then north in Saint-Lazare, up to the limit of Saint-Nérée;
  northeasterly, curving northeasterly to the boundary between the municipalities of Saint-Nérée and Saint-Gervais;
  north-west to a road;
  north-west to a road that crosses the Faubourg-du-Moulin;
  northward to the confluence of the Larochelle stream;
  north, up to its confluence.

The Moulin River empties on the south shore of Bras Saint-Michel in the municipality of Saint-Gervais (at the limit of Saint-Charles-Borromée).

Toponymy 
The toponym Rivière du Moulin was made official on January 21, 1975, at the Commission de toponymie du Québec.

See also 

 List of rivers of Quebec

References 

Rivers of Chaudière-Appalaches
Bellechasse Regional County Municipality